Hermann End (born 2 May 1942) is a German field hockey player. He competed in the men's tournament at the 1968 Summer Olympics.

References

External links
 

1942 births
Living people
German male field hockey players
Olympic field hockey players of West Germany
Field hockey players at the 1968 Summer Olympics
Sportspeople from Nuremberg